DHL Aero Expreso Flight 7216 was an international cargo flight between Costa Rica's Juan Santamaría International Airport and Guatemala City's La Aurora International Airport. On April 7, 2022, the Boeing 757 operating the flight suffered a hydraulic failure, and crashed on landing at the Costa Rican airport. Neither of the two pilots were injured.

History of the flight 

The flight took off at 9:34 am local time (UTC−6:00) from Juan Santamaría International Airport to La Aurora International Airport to deliver cargo. However, while flying over the Costa Rican town of Mueller San Carlos (or the Parque Nacional Juan Castro Blanco, it is unclear), the aircraft declared an emergency due to hydraulic problems, for which it made the decision to return to the air terminal, after holding a pattern to burn fuel, and touched down at 10:25 am (local time).

According to videos recorded from the airport, the aircraft skidded and thereafter its gear collapsed. It then veered over 90 degrees to the right on taxiway Kilo, crashing into a ditch in front of the Costa Rica Fire Station and breaking apart. Neither pilot was physically injured, but one pilot underwent medical checks as a precaution.

Aircraft 
The aircraft involved was a 22-year-old Boeing 757-27AF registered HP-2010DAE, with serial number 29610 and line number 904, delivered to DHL Aero Expreso in November 2010. The aircraft was first delivered to Far Eastern Air Transport in December 1999 as a passenger aircraft. The aircraft was leased to EVA Air from May 2002 to January 2004 before returning to Far Eastern Air Transport. The aircraft was withdrawn from service and later converted into a freighter aircraft in October 2010.

Aftermath 
The aircraft was written off as a result of the crash. Making it the 12th hull loss of the Boeing 757.

References 

Aviation accidents and incidents in 2022
2022 in Costa Rica
April 2022 events in North America
Aviation accidents and incidents in Costa Rica
Accidents and incidents involving the Boeing 757
2022 disasters in North America